Rainbow Tour may refer to:
 An event in the life of Eva Perón
 "Rainbow Tour", a song in the musical Evita
 Rainbow World Tour, a worldwide arena concert tour in 2000 by Mariah Carey
 Rainbow Tour (Kesha), 2017–2018 world tour by Kesha
 Rainbow Tour 2009, by Miho Fukuhara